Arto Lilja (born 16 April 1973) is a Finnish ski-orienteering competitor. He won a bronze medal in the middle distance at the 2004 World Ski Orienteering Championships. He placed third in the overall World Cup in 2003.

See also
 Finnish orienteers
 List of orienteers
 List of orienteering events

References

Finnish orienteers
Male orienteers
Ski-orienteers
1973 births
Living people